"Civilization" is a single by the French band Justice and the first from their second studio album Audio, Video, Disco. The single, Justice's first via Elektra Records, was initially set to be released on iTunes on 4 April 2011, before becoming available on other digital retailers on April 11. The track was released early through iTunes France on 28 March and globally through iTunes on 29 March 2011.

The track features vocals from British singer Ali Love. The song was previewed in a two-minute advertisement for Adidas, which was directed by Romain Gavras. Gavras has worked with Justice previously, directing the music video for their song "Stress" in 2008, and filming a documentary 'A Cross In The Universe' about Justice's American tour in 2008. The single was re-released on 6 June with remixes from Mr. Oizo and The Fucking Champs.

Critical reception
Eric Magnuson of Rolling Stone gave the single a rating of three-and-a-half stars out of five, complimenting its "high-end baguette beat-down". He compared the song to a mix of Daft Punk's "Aerodynamic" and The Who's "Baba O'Riley". Ben Gilbert of Yahoo! Music UK & Ireland gave a positive review, calling the song "fried and fiercesome ".

Composition
Civilization is in the common time of 4/4. It is played at a tempo of 112 BPM, with a change to 90 BPM on the 17th measure, returning to 112 on the 33rd. It is in the key of A minor.

Music video
The music video was created by French director Edouard Salier and features a very symbolic portrayal of iconic statues and structures falling after the world upturns—presumably—killing all the buffalo. The clip was produced using a labor-intensive combination of CGI and 3D animation. It was nominated for the 2011 MTV Europe Music Award for Best Video.

Track listing
Single sided 12" single
"Civilization" – 4:11
"Civilization" (demo) – 3:45

Digital download single
"Civilization" – 4:11

Digital download EP
"Civilization" – 4:10
"Civilization" (demo version) – 3:38
"Civilization" (Mr. Oizo Remix) – 3:31
"Civilization" (The Fucking Champs Remix) – 4:42
"Civilization" (video)

Charts

References

2011 singles
Justice (band) songs